is a city in Hyōgo Prefecture, Japan. , the city had an estimated population of 95,485 in 45562 households and a population density of 5200 persons per km².

Geography
Ashiya is located between Kobe and Nishinomiya, and is the second smallest municipality in Hyōgo Prefecture. The ground gentle slopes from the Rokko Mountains in the north to Osaka Bay in the south. It has a reputation as a high-end residential area, especially in the Hirata-cho and Matsuhama-cho neighborhoods, and in the northern end of the city.

Neighboring municipalities 
Hyōgo Prefecture
Higashinada-ku, Kobe
Nishinomiya

Climate
Ashiya has a Humid subtropical climate (Köppen Cfa) characterized by warm summers and cool winters with light snowfall.  The average annual temperature in Ashiya is 14.6 °C. The average annual rainfall is 1578 mm with September as the wettest month. The temperatures are highest on average in January, at around 26.4 °C, and lowest in January, at around 3.3 °C.

Demographics
Per Japanese census data, the population of Ashiya has been increasing since the 1920s.

History
The area of Ashiya was part of ancient Settsu Province and was mostly tenryō territory under direct control the Tokugawa shogunate during the Edo Period. Ashiya was established in 1871 as a township in Hyōgo Prefecture and was designated part of Seido village (精道村) on April 1, 1889 with the creation of the modern municipalities system. In the early 1900s, it was designated as an urban planning area and became one of the centers of the Hanshinkan Modernism movement in terms of architecture and culture. This led to the building of large single-family homes with tennis courts, swimming pools, and tea houses, etc. along the hills overlooking Osaka Bay. Seido was promoted to city status on November 10, 1940, changing its name to "Ashiya". 

In 1945, the City of Ashiya prohibited the operation of pachinko parlors, gambling and entertainment facilities as well as small factories. This ordinance includes prohibitions on rooftop advertisements, advertising balloons, and a complete ban on flashing lights. Those laws still stand and there is no other municipal government with similar regulations in Japan. In 1991, Ashiya residents elected Harue Kitamura as the first woman to hold the office of mayor of a city in Japan. Kitamura was mayor when Ashiya suffered major damage during the Kobe earthquake on January 17, 1995. Over 50% of the urban area of Ashiya was destroyed by the earthquake, and there were 444 fatalities.

Government
Ashiya has a mayor-council form of government with a directly elected mayor and a unicameral city council of 21 members. Ashiya contributes one member to the Hyōgo Prefectural Assembly. In terms of national politics, the city is part of Hyōgo 7th districts of the lower house of the Diet of Japan.

Economy
Ashiya is primarily a residential city and commuter town for the Osaka and Kobe metropoles.

Education
Ashiya has eight public elementary schools and three public middle schools operated by the city government, and two public high schools operated by the Hyōgo Prefectural Board of Education. There are two private middle schools and three private high schools. In addition, the prefecture also operates one public middle school and one special education school for the handicapped.

Transportation

Railways 
The first railway line to the city was completed in 1905. Central Ashiya is served by JR West Ashiya Station. Hanshin Electric Railway Ashiya Station and Uchide Station serve the southern part of the city, while Hankyu Railway Ashiyagawa Station is located in the quieter northern area.

 JR West - JR Kōbe Line
  
 Hankyu - Hankyū Kōbe Main Line
  
 Hanshin Electric Railway - Hanshin Main Line
   -

Highways 
 Hanshin Expressway Kobe Route
 Hanshin Expressway Bayshore Route (Port of Osaka-Kobe)

Sister city relations
  Montebello, California, United States
A sister city agreement was signed between Ashiya and Montebello, California on May 24, 1961. Student Ambassadors are chosen to travel to Montebello every year since 1964.

Local attractions
 Yodokō Guest House, a house designed by Frank Lloyd Wright located on a hill overlooking Hankyu Ashiyagawa Station and Osaka Bay. It was completed in 1924 as a residence for the Yamamura family, founders of the famous sake company "Sakuramasamune". It is open for tours. Ashiya also features the house of Hiroko Koshino, The Koshino House at about 600 meters altitude in the Okuike affluent residential area of the city, designed by Pritzker Architecture Prize winner Tadao Ando.

Culture and people
Persons of note associated with Ashiya include Jirō Shirasu ("the man who reproached MacArthur"), Ryōji Noyori (Nobel prize winner), Takashi Asahina (conductor), Junichirō Tanizaki (writer), Haruki Murakami (writer), Yuriko Koike (House of Representatives member), Yōko Ogawa (writer), Tsumasaburō Bandō (kabuki actor), Morinosuke Kawaguchi (futurist), Tsuruko Yamazaki (artist), Takuya Kuroda (jazz trumpeter and arranger) and professional sumo wrestler Takakeishō Mitsunobu.

The city is the main setting in Jun'ichiro Tanizaki's novel Sasameyuki (細雪） (The Makioka Sisters, Eng. trans. Edward G. Seidensticker).

References

External links

  
 Ashiya-People.com Local media website 

Cities in Hyōgo Prefecture
Populated coastal places in Japan
Ashiya, Hyōgo